Leto Atreides is the name of three characters in the fictional Dune universe created by Frank Herbert:

 Leto I Atreides, father of Paul "Muad'Dib" Atreides
 Leto II Atreides the Elder, first son of Paul Atreides and Chani; killed in his infancy
 Leto II Atreides the (God Emperor of Dune), son of Paul Atreides and Chani and twin to Ghanima